Restless Heart is an American country music band established in 1984. The band's members are Larry Stewart (lead vocals), John Dittrich (drums, vocals), Paul Gregg (bass guitar, vocals), Dave Innis (piano, keyboards, guitar, vocals), and Greg Jennings (lead guitar, mandolin, vocals). Record producer Tim DuBois assembled the band to record demos and chose Verlon Thompson as the original lead singer, but he was replaced by Stewart in this role before the band had recorded any material. Between 1984 and 1998, Restless Heart recorded for RCA Records Nashville, releasing the albums Restless Heart, Wheels, Big Dreams in a Small Town, Fast Movin' Train, Big Iron Horses, and Matters of the Heart. Stewart left for a solo career before Big Iron Horses, which resulted in Dittrich, Innis, and Gregg rotating as lead vocalists in his absence. Innis also departed before Matters of the Heart, and the band ultimately went on hiatus from 1994 to 1998. During this time, Jennings became a member of Vince Gill's road band and Dittrich recorded one album in the band The Buffalo Club. Outside a brief reunion for new tracks on a Greatest Hits album in 1998, the band remained inactive until 2002, when Dittrich, Gregg, Innis, Jennings, and Stewart resumed touring. Two years later, they issued Still Restless on Audium Entertainment.

Overall, Restless Heart has released seven studio albums and two greatest-hits albums. Their second through fifth albums are all certified gold by the Recording Industry Association of America, and 26 of their singles have entered the Billboard Hot Country Songs charts, including six that reached number one. Four of their country releases also crossed over to the Adult Contemporary chart, with two of those ("I'll Still Be Loving You" in 1987 and "When She Cries" in 1992) also reaching top 40 on the Billboard Hot 100. The band also had a number one on Adult Contemporary in 1993 with "Tell Me What You Dream", a collaboration with Canadian  smooth jazz saxophonist Warren Hill. Restless Heart's sound is defined by their country pop arrangements and vocal harmony, with many critics comparing them to the Eagles.

History

Formation and early years
Nashville, Tennessee-based record producer Tim DuBois created the band in 1984 to record demos of songs that he had written. The members he chose were drummer John Dittrich (born April 7, 1951), bass guitarist Paul Gregg (born December 3, 1954), keyboardist Dave Innis (born April 9, 1959), lead guitarist Greg Jennings (born October 2, 1954), and lead singer Verlon Thompson (born January 5, 1954). Thompson left before the band had officially been named or released a single, because he did not feel comfortable with the country pop style that DuBois wanted the band to pursue. Replacing him on lead vocals was Larry Stewart (born March 2, 1959), who was also working as a demo vocalist at the time, and was a college friend of Innis's. After leaving the group, Thompson recorded both by himself and in collaboration with Guy Clark, in addition to writing several country hit singles in the 1990s. The band then began recording demos with Stewart on lead vocals. One of the demos they recorded was for "Love in the First Degree", later a hit for Alabama. Due to the success of the demos, the members chose to become an official band, and they were signed to RCA Records Nashville in 1984.

1984–1986: Restless Heart
After assuming the name Restless Heart, the band released its self-titled debut album on RCA in 1984. It charted four singles on Billboard Hot Country Songs: "Let the Heartache Ride", "I Want Everyone to Cry", "(Back to the) Heartbreak Kid" (previously recorded by Kathy Mattea on her self-titled debut album), and "Til I Loved You." DuBois co-wrote "Let the Heartache Ride" and "Heartbreak Kid" with Van Stephenson, who would later become one-third of the country pop trio Blackhawk in the 1990s. After the success of "I Want Everyone to Cry", the band's first top-ten hit, DuBois and RCA promoted the band through radio showcases and music video rotation, including the video for "Heartbreak Kid", which aired on VH-1. DuBois felt that touring was not a financial necessity for the band at the time, due to all five members also being session musicians, and having songwriting contracts with Warner Music Group at the time. While under such a contract, Innis co-wrote "Dare Me", a hit single for The Pointer Sisters.

1986–1988: Wheels
Two years later came Wheels which produced four consecutive No. 1 hits on the country music charts: "That Rock Won't Roll", "I'll Still Be Loving You", "Why Does It Have to Be (Wrong or Right)",  and the title track, written by Dave Loggins. "I'll Still Be Loving You" and "Why Does It Have to Be (Wrong or Right)" were both hits on the Adult Contemporary charts, as was "New York (Hold Her Tight)", which was released only to that format. Furthermore, "I'll Still Be Loving You" entered the top 40 on the Billboard Hot 100, which was particularly noteworthy during a time where country music's presence on the pop charts was waning considerably.  The album was certified gold by the Recording Industry Association of America (RIAA) for shipments of 500,000 copies. Another track from the album, "Hummingbird", was later recorded by Ricky Skaggs on his 1989 album Kentucky Thunder, and was a top 20 country hit for him in 1990. Tom Roland of Allmusic wrote that "[t]he guys found their niche with this project. Big, overpowering sound, heavy backbeats, and very tight harmonies are here."

1988–1989: Big Dreams in a Small Town
The band's third album, Big Dreams in a Small Town, came in 1988. From it came two more number ones: "The Bluest Eyes in Texas" and "A Tender Lie", as well as top-five hits in its title track and "Say What's in Your Heart". The latter of these was also a number one on the RPM country charts in Canada. This album was also the first to feature members other than Stewart on lead vocals: Gregg sang "El Dorado" and shared lead vocals with Stewart on "Carved in Stone", while Dittrich sang "Calm Before the Storm". The band members wrote some of the songs themselves, while others were co-written by outside writers, including "A Tender Lie", written by Randy Sharp. People gave the album a positive review, noting the band's musicianship and prominent vocal harmony, as well as the "considerable amount of passion" in their music relative to their contemporaries.

1990–1991: Fast Movin' Train
Restless Heart's fourth album, Fast Movin' Train, was released in 1990. Its title track (also written by Loggins) and "Dancy's Dream" were top-five hits, while "When Somebody Loves You" and "Long Lost Friend" were less successful. Robert K. Oermann of The Tennessean found this album superior to the ones before it, praising the "direct approach" of the singles' lyrics, while also noting a roots rock influence in the increased use of acoustic instruments over the preceding albums.

Stewart also sang backing vocals on "They Just Don't Make 'em Like You Anymore", a track from Kenny Rogers' 1991 album Back Home Again.

1991–1992: The Best of Restless Heart and Larry Stewart's departure
A greatest hits package, The Best of Restless Heart, followed in 1991. It included two new recordings, both of which were released as singles: "You Can Depend on Me" at No. 3 and "Familiar Pain" at number 40. Larry Stewart left the band in 1992 to pursue a solo career, also on RCA. His solo debut single "Alright Already" reached No. 5 on the country music charts in 1993. He recorded one album for RCA and two for Columbia Records between then and 1997, and while these albums accounted for seven more charted singles, none were as successful.

1992–1993: Big Iron Horses
Dittrich, Gregg, and Innis rotated as lead vocalists on the band's fifth studio release, 1992's Big Iron Horses. This album produced the band's biggest crossover hit in "When She Cries", which went to number 9 on the country charts, number 11 on the Billboard Hot 100 (their highest entry on that chart), and number two on the Adult Contemporary charts. After it came "We Got the Love" (guest musician on banjo was original Eagles member Bernie Leadon) and "Mending Fences", which both fell short of the country top 10 and its title track, "Big Iron Horses", was far less successful, peaking at number 72. Keyboardist Dave Innis also left the band in 1993, reducing the band to a trio. That same year, the band reached the top of the Adult Contemporary charts as guest vocalists on jazz saxophonist Warren Hill's debut single "Tell Me What You Dream."

1994–2015: Disbanding and reunion
The next album, 1994's Matters of the Heart, included only Gregg, Jennings and Dittrich, with studio musicians rounding out the roster. Its only single, "Baby Needs New Shoes", fell short of the top 40, and the remaining three members disbanded at the end of 1994. Jennings joined Vince Gill's band, while Dittrich founded a band called The Buffalo Club in 1997 with Charlie Kelly and lead singer Ron Hemby, formerly and currently of The Imperials. The Buffalo Club recorded one album for Rising Tide Records and charted three singles, including the top-10 country hit "If She Don't Love You" (a song which had previously been turned down by Restless Heart), before the band split at the end of the year.

The original Restless Heart members, except Innis, reunited to record three new tracks for their second greatest-hits compilation in 1998, Greatest Hits. This album produced their first top-40 country hit in five years, "No End to This Road". After a year-long tour with Vince Gill and another year of dates on their own, Restless Heart went on hiatus once more.

In 2002, Gregg placed a phone call to Innis, with whom he had not had any contact in 10 years. That led to Restless Heart reuniting once again and returning the band to its complete classic lineup. They soon began touring and released a single called "Torch of Freedom" which did not chart. In 2004, the band signed to Koch Records, then went into a Muscle Shoals, Alabama, recording studio to record the first full-length album to feature the original lineup since 1990's Fast Movin' Train. The new album, titled Still Restless, was co-produced by Mac McAnally and Kyle Lehning, with three of its songs having previously been recorded by McAnally himself. Its lead-off single, "Feel My Way to You", peaked at number 29 on the country music charts. However, Koch closed its Nashville division in early 2005, and the album did not produce any other singles. The band released a live album, 25 and Live, in 2007 through their website.

To commemorate the band's 30th anniversary, Restless Heart began its 30 Years & Still Restless Tour. The band also announced plans to release new music in 2013, but no further details were revealed.

In 2015, Restless Heart was inducted into the Oklahoma Music Hall of Fame. The band's Dave Innis, Paul Gregg, and Greg Jennings hail from the state.

Musical stylings
DuBois said that he conceived Restless Heart as "a hot, instrumental band that could really play well on stage—that had great harmony" and that he had given them songs that he felt were "natural" but had been rejected by other artists such as Alabama for being "too pop". He noted that during showcases for radio representatives early in the band's career, he was often questioned on the band's ability to "duplicate their records live" due to them having been assembled in a studio setting, but felt that live performances were not an issue due to the band having played and sung everything on their debut album without any additional musicians or vocalists.

Restless Heart's sound draws influences from mainstream country music, as well as from pop and rock. Their use of layered harmonies and multiple Adult Contemporary crossover hits have drawn comparisons to the Eagles. A 1985 article in Billboard wrote that debut single "Let the Heartache Ride" "introduced the band's razor-edged vocal harmonies and scorching instrumentals."

Band members

Discography 

Albums
Restless Heart (1985)
Wheels (1986)
Big Dreams in a Small Town (1988)
Fast Movin' Train (1990)
The Best of Restless Heart (1991)
Big Iron Horses (1992)
Matters of the Heart (1994)
Greatest Hits (1998)
Still Restless (2004)

References

External links 
 

 
Country music groups from Tennessee
Musical groups from Nashville, Tennessee
Musical groups established in 1984
Musical groups reestablished in 2002
Musical quintets
RCA Records Nashville artists
MNRK Music Group artists